Villaluenga de la Sagra is a municipality located in the province of Toledo, Castile-La Mancha, Spain. 
According to the 2006 census (INE), the municipality had a population of 3,216 inhabitants.

References

Municipalities in the Province of Toledo